Elections to South Tyneside Metropolitan Borough Council were held on 1 May 2008.

After the election, the composition of the council was:
 Labour 31
 Independent 12
 Progressive 5
 Liberal Democrat 3
 Conservative 3

See also
 South Tyneside local elections

References

2008
2008 English local elections
21st century in Tyne and Wear